The 2002 Chattanooga Mocs football team represented the University of Tennessee at Chattanooga as a member of the Southern Conference (SoCon) in the 2002 NCAA Division I-AA football season. The Mocs were led by third-year head coach Donnie Kirkpatrick and played their home games at Finley Stadium. They finished the season 2–10 overall and 2–6 in SoCon play to tied for seventh place.

Schedule

References

Chattanooga
Chattanooga Mocs football seasons
Chattanooga Mocs football